A holon (from , holos, 'whole' and , -on, 'part') is something that is simultaneously a whole in and of itself, as well as a part of a larger whole. In other words, holons can be understood as the constituent part–wholes of a hierarchy. 

The holon represents a way to overcome the dichotomy between parts and wholes, as well as a way to account for both the self-assertive and the integrative tendencies of organisms. The term was coined by Arthur Koestler in The Ghost in the Machine (1967). In Koestler's formulations, a holon is something that has integrity and identity while simultaneously being a part of a larger system; it is a subsystem of a greater system.

Holons are sometimes discussed in the context of self-organizing holarchic open (SOHO) systems.

History

Precursors 
The concept of hierarchy and of their constituent part–wholes (or, holons) has existed for a long time, with theories primarily proposed as a way to explain natural and social phenomena. In fact, through the Middles Ages, hierarchy was perhaps the dominant way of understanding the connection between the natural, the human, and the supernatural orders of being.

In pre-Socratic philosophy, Leucippus and Democritus developed the abstract concept of the atom, using it to develop a philosophy that could explain all observed events. Aristotle used hierarchy as the methodology for collecting and linking biological knowledge. In the 17th century, Gottfried Wilhelm Leibniz introduced his concept of the monad as an irreducible unit for explaining both the physical world as well as the internal world of the soul.

Three centuries later, in the early 20th century, Charles Darwin's theory of evolution sparked interest in holism and hierarchy. In particular, Jan Smuts articulated his concept of holism in "Evolution and Holism" (1926), outlining the rich connections between the natural and social worlds. Smuts states that, "Everywhere we look in nature we see nothing but wholes."

Founding 
While hierarchical networks and orders of development have been considered throughout various times in history, Arthur Koestler was the first to formulate a complete concept of these constituent part–wholes of hierarchies in systems theory.

Prior to introducing the term holon itself, Koestler articulated the concept in The Act of Creation (1964), in which he refers to the relationship between the searches for subjective and objective knowledge:Einstein's space is no closer to reality than Van Gogh's sky. The glory of science is not in a truth more absolute than the truth of Bach or Tolstoy, but in the act of creation itself. The scientist's discoveries impose his own order on chaos, as the composer or painter imposes his; an order that always refers to limited aspects of reality, and is based on the observer's frame of reference, which differs from period to period as a Rembrant nude differs from a nude by Manet.Koestler would finally propose the term holon in The Ghost in the Machine (1967), using it to describe natural organisms as composed of semi-autonomous sub-wholes (or, parts) that are linked in a form of hierarchy, a holarchy, to form a whole.  The title of the book itself points to the notion that the entire 'machine' of life and of the universe itself is ever-evolving toward more and more complex states, as if a ghost were operating the machine.

Koestler was influenced by two observations in proposing the notion of the holon:

 The first observation was influenced by a story told to him by Herbert A. Simon—the 'parable of the two watchmakers'—in which Simon concludes that complex systems evolve from simple systems much more rapidly when there are stable intermediate forms present in the evolutionary process compared to when they are not present.
 The second observation was made by Koestler himself in his analysis of hierarchies and stable intermediate forms in non-living matter (atomic and molecular structure), living organisms, and social organizations.

Koestler concluded that, although sub-wholes or parts are easy to identify, wholes and parts in an absolute sense do not exist anywhere. He proposed the word holon to describe the hybrid nature of sub-wholes and parts within in vivo systems. From this perspective, holons exist simultaneously as self-contained wholes in relation to their sub-ordinate parts, and as dependent parts when considered from the inverse direction.

Koestler developed his concept of the 'holon' to take on three key issues that he believed to be facing the social sciences in the post-war generation. First, he found the need for some model that could bring together and integrate the reductionist and mechanistic perspectives of the 'scientific' and behavioural psychologies with the holistic and humanistic perspectives of the Freudian, Gestalt, and Rogerian psychologies. Second, he recognized the significance of evolutionary processes in the social sciences and sought to provide some theoretical system that could apply evolutionary formulations to both fields. Lastly, he wished to construct a model of human social systems that was equally familiar in analyzing the micro-level of individuality and the macro-level of collectivity; a basic explanatory model that could relate across the span of human activity and involvement.

Development 
Ken Wilber adopted Koestler's formulation of the holon as a way of highlighting the hierarchical/holarchical nature of reality. Though he would first make (published) reference to the concept in his 1983 book Eye to Eye, Wilber began his expansion of the idea over a decade later in Sex, Ecology, Spirituality (1995).

By stating that "[r]eality as a whole is not composed of things or processes, but of holons," Wilber clearly identifies the holon as the central unit of explanation, thereby providing a basis for linking all fields of scientific and cultural knowledge, from which scientific explanations of social phenomena can be developed.

Overview

Etymology 
The word holon is a combination of the Greek holos meaning 'whole', with the suffix -on which denotes a particle or part (as in proton and neutron).

In this way, holon is a part–whole; a nodal point in a hierarchy that describes the relationship between entities that are self-complete wholes and entities that are viewed to be other dependent parts. As one's point of focus moves up, down, and/or across the nodes of a hierarchical structure, their perception of what is a whole and what is a part will also change.

General definition
According to Arthur Koestler, holons are self-reliant units that possess a degree of independence and can handle contingencies without asking higher authorities for instructions (i.e., they have a degree of autonomy). These holons are also simultaneously subject to control from one or more of these higher authorities. The first property ensures that holons are stable forms that are able to withstand disturbances, while the latter property signifies that they are intermediate forms, providing a context for the proper functionality for the larger whole.

In this way, a holon is a subsystem within a larger system: it is simultaneously an evolving, self-organizing, dissipative structure while also a part of a greater system composed of other holons. Holons are sometimes discussed in the context of self-organizing holarchic open (SOHO) systems.

A holon is maintained by the throughput of matter–energy and information–entropy, connected to other holons; it is a whole in itself but also, at the same time, it is nested within another holon and is thus a part of something much larger than itself.

Holons range in size, from the smallest subatomic particles and strings, all the way up to the multiverse, which comprises many universes. Individual humans, their societies and their cultures are intermediate-level holons, created by the interaction of forces working upon people both top-down and bottom-up. On a non-physical level, words, ideas, sounds, emotions—everything that can be identified—are parts of something while simultaneously having parts of their own (similar to signs in regard of semiotics).

In 2013, Australian academic J.T. Velikovsky proposed the holon as the structure of the meme, the unit of culture, synthesizing the major theories on memes by Richard Dawkins, Mihaly Csikszentmihalyi, E. O. Wilson, Frederick Turner, and Arthur Koestler. Defined in this way, holons are related to the concept of autopoiesis, especially in that it was developed in the application of Stafford Beer to second-order cybernetics and the viable system model, but also Niklas Luhmann in his social systems theory.

Since a holon is embedded in larger wholes, it is influenced by and influences these larger wholes. Moreover, since a holon also contains subsystems, or parts, it is similarly influenced by and influences these parts. Information flows bidirectionally between smaller and larger systems as well as rhizomatic contagion. When this bidirectionality of information flow and the understanding of role are compromised, for whatever reason, the system begins to break down: wholes no longer recognize their dependence on their subsidiary parts, and parts no longer recognize the organizing authority of the wholes. Cancer, for example, may be understood as such a breakdown in the biological realm.

Holarchy 

A hierarchy of holons is called a holarchy, which Koestler defines as a hierarchy of self-regulating holons that function (a) as autonomous wholes in supra-ordination to their parts; (b) as dependent parts in sub-ordination to controls on higher levels; or (c) in co-ordination with their local environment. The holarchic model can be seen as an attempt to modify and modernise perceptions of natural hierarchy.

Ken Wilber comments that the test of holon hierarchy (i.e., holarchy) is that, if all instances of a given type of holon cease to exist, then all the holons they were part of must cease to exist too. Thus, an atom is of a lower standing in the hierarchy than a molecule, because if one removed all molecules, atoms could still exist, whereas if all atoms were removed, molecules, in a strict sense, would cease to exist. 

Wilber's concept is known as the doctrine of the fundamental and the significant. For instance, a hydrogen atom is more fundamental than an ant, but an ant is more significant. This doctrine is contrasted by the radical rhizome-oriented pragmatics of Gilles Deleuze and Felix Guattari, and other continental philosophy.

A significant feature of Koestler's concept of holarchy is that it is open-ended, in both the macrocosmic and microcosmic dimensions. This aspect of his theory has several important implications. For example, if one were to take string theory to be legitimate, the holarchic system does not begin with strings nor does it end with the multiverse. Those are just the present limits of the reach of the human mind in the two dimensions. Humans will cross those limits eventually, because they do not encompass the whole of reality. In Objective Knowledge (1972), Karl Popper teaches that, what the human mind knows and can ever know of truth at a given point of time and space is verisimilitude—something like truth—and that the human mind will continue to get closer to reality but never reach it. In other words, the human quest for knowledge is an unending journey with innumerable grand sights ahead but with no possibility of reaching the journey's end.

The work of modern physicists designed to discover the theory of everything (TOE) is reaching deep into the microcosm under the assumption that the macrocosm is eventually made of the microcosm. This approach falls short on two counts: the first is that the fundamental is not the same as significant; secondly, this approach does not take into account that the microcosmic dimension is open ended. It follows that the search for TOE will discover phenomena more microcosmic than strings or the more comprehensive M theory. It is also the case that many laws of nature that apply to systems relatively low in the hierarchy cease to apply at higher levels. M theory might have predictive power at the sub-atomic level but it will inform but little about reality at higher levels. The work of the particle physicists is indeed laudable but possibly they should give the theory they are looking for another name. This is not to claim that the concept of holarchy is already the theory of everything.

Types

Individual holon
An individual holon possesses a dominant monad; that is, it possesses a definable I-ness'. An individual holon is discrete, self-contained, and also demonstrates the quality of agency, or self-directed behavior.

The individual holon, although a discrete and self-contained whole, is made up of parts; in the case of a human, examples of these parts would include the heart, lungs, liver, brain, spleen, etc. When a human exercises agency, taking a step to the left, for example, the entire holon, including the constituent parts, moves together as one unit.

Social holon
A social holon does not possess a dominant monad; it possesses only a definable we-ness', as it is a collective made up of individual holons.

In addition, rather than possessing discrete agency, a social holon possesses what is defined as nexus agency. An illustration of nexus agency is best described by a flock of geese: each goose is an individual holon, the flock makes up a social holon; although the flock moves as one unit when flying, and is "directed" by the choices of the lead goose, the flock itself is not mandated to follow that lead goose. Another way to consider this would be collective activity that has the potential for independent internal activity at any given moment.

Artifacts
American philosopher Ken Wilber includes artifacts in his theory of holons. Artifacts are anything (such as a statue or a piece of music) that is created by either an individual holon or a social holon (e.g., a statue is made up of atoms). While lacking any of the defining structural characteristics—agency, self-maintenance, I-ness, self transcendence—of the previous two holons, artifacts are useful to include in a comprehensive scheme due to their potential to replicate aspects of and profoundly affect (via, e.g., interpretation) the previously described holons.

The development of Artificial Intelligence may force one to question where the line should be drawn between the individual holon and the artifact.

Heaps
Heaps are defined as random collections of holons that lack any sort of organisational significance. A pile of leaves would be an example of a heap. (Note, one could question whether a pile of leaves could be an "artifact" of an ecosystem "social holon".) 

This raises a problem of intentionality; in short, if social holons create artifacts but lack intentionality (the domain of individual holons), the question turns to how one can distinguish between heaps and artifacts. Further, if an artist (individual holon) paints a picture (artifact) in a deliberately chaotic and unstructured way, one may ask whether such becomes a heap.

In multiagent systems 

Multiagent systems are systems composed of autonomous software entities. They are able to simulate a system or solve problems. A holon, just like an agent, is an intelligent entity able to interact with the environment and to make decisions to solve a specific problem. A Holon has the noteworthy property of playing the role of a whole and a part at the same time. This reflects at the organizational level: Holarchy functions first as autonomous wholes in supra-ordination to their parts, secondly as dependent parts in sub-ordination to controls on higher levels, and thirdly in coordination with their local environment.

The SARL agent-oriented programming language has native support for the concept of holon, and the associated run-time environment, Janus, enables running the implemented holons.

See also
 Bell's theorem
 Mereology
Meme
Heterarchy
 Holism
 Holism in ecological anthropology
 Holism in science
 Holomovement
 Integral theory
 Janus
 Le Chatelier's principle
 Metasystem transition
 Philotics
 Protocol stack
 Sacred geometry
 Self-similarity
 Holon (sculpture), Portland, Oregon
Writers
 Arthur Koestler
 David Bohm
 James J. Kay
 Herbert A. Simon
 Ken Wilber

References

Further reading
 Edwards, Mark. 2003 October. "A brief history of the concept of holons." Integral World. 
Koestler, Arthur. [1967] 1990. The Ghost in the Machine . London: Hutchinson (Penguin Group). .
Mella, Piero. 2009. The Holonic Revolution Holons, Holarchies and Holonic Networks: The Ghost in the Production Machine. Pavia University Press. .  

Simon, Herbert A. 1990. The Sciences of the Artificial (6th ed.). Cambridge, MA: MIT Press. .
Velikovsky, J. T. 2014. "Flow Theory, Evolution & Creativity: or, ‘Fun & Games'." The International Interactive Entertainment 2014 Conference. Newcastle, Australia. Lay Summary.
Wilber, Ken. 1995. Sex, ecology and spirituality: The spirit of evolution. New York: Shambhala.

External links
 An even briefer history of the term holon
 Arthur Koestler text on holon
 Ecosystems and Holarchies - a new way to look at hierarchies
 Holons, holarchy, and beyond
 The holonic structure of the meme, the unit of culture

Holism
Integral thought
Networks